Collins Building may refer to:

Collins Building (Boston, Massachusetts), listed on the U.S. National Register of Historic Places (NRHP)
Collins Building (Colville, Washington), NRHP-listed in Stevens County
Collins Building (Seattle, Washington)

See also
Collins House (disambiguation)